Yulia Sergeyevna Grichenko (born 10 March 1990) is a Russian footballer. She plays as a goalkeeper for Zenit in the Russian Championship and the Russia national team.

Club career
She played five seasons for Kubanochka Krasnodar from 2010 until 2015. She moved to Rossiyanka ahead of the 2016 season.

Since February 2020 she plays as a goalkeeper for ZFK Zenit Saint Petersburg.

International career
She was called up to be part of the national team for the UEFA Women's Euro 2013.

Personal life
Grichenko was born in Bataysk.

References

External links
 
 
 
 Profile at soccerdonna.de 
 Profile at fussballtransfers.com 

1990 births
Living people
Russian women's footballers
Russia women's international footballers
Kubanochka Krasnodar players
WFC Rossiyanka players
Women's association football goalkeepers
Universiade medalists in football
Universiade bronze medalists for Russia
ZFK Zenit Saint Petersburg players
Russian people of Ukrainian descent
People from Bataysk
Sportspeople from Rostov Oblast
Russian Women's Football Championship players
UEFA Women's Euro 2017 players